The 1936 Swedish Ice Hockey Championship was the 15th season of the Swedish Ice Hockey Championship, the national championship of Sweden. Hammarby IF won the championship.

Tournament

First round 
 IK Göta - IK Sture 2:1
 Södertälje SK - IFK Mariefred 1:1/4:0
 IK Hermes - Djurgårdshofs IF 9:0
 Södertälje IF - UoIF Matteuspojkarna 3:1

Quarterfinals 
 AIK - Tranebergs IF 4:0
 IK Göta - Södertälje SK 4:1
 Hammarby IF - Karlbergs BK 4:0
 IK Hermes - Södertälje IF 4:1

Semifinals
 AIK - IK Göta 3:1
 Hammarby IF - IK Hermes 4:1

Final 
  AIK - Hammarby IF 1:1 n.V./1:5

External links
 Season on hockeyarchives.info

Cham
Swedish Ice Hockey Championship seasons